An Leabhar Muimhneach, also known as The Book of Munster, is an Irish genealogical manuscript.

An Leabhar Muimhneach is preserved in a number of 18th century manuscripts, the best being the work of the scribe Richard Tipper of Dublin, 1716-1717. Based on works compiled by Domhnall Ó Duinnín and Tadhg mac Dáire Mheic Bhruaideadha, in the early 17th century. A translation was made by Rev. Eugene O'Keeffe in 1703, and a complete scholarly edition by Tadhg Ó Donnchadha in 1940.

Sources
 The Celebrated Antiquary, p. 156, Nollaig Ó Muraíle, Maynooth, 1996.

References

External links
 Ó Donnchadha, Tadhg (ed.), An Leabhar Muimhneach maraon le suim aguisíní (The Book of Munster). Produced for the Irish Manuscripts Commission / Baile Átha Cliath: Foillseacháin Rialtais. 1940. 
 O'Keeffe, Rev. Eugene (tr.), Eoghanacht Genealogies from the Book of Munster. (Book of Munster abridged but with additions from other manuscripts). Cork. 1703.

Irish manuscripts
Irish genealogy
18th-century books
Irish language
Irish-language literature